Aphodius fimetarius is a species of scarab beetle native to Europe.

References

Scarabaeidae
Beetles described in 1758
Beetles of Europe
Taxa named by Carl Linnaeus